Ljubomir Vulović (6 January 1876 – 27 June 1917), known by his nickname Ljuba (Љуба), was an artillery major in the Serbian Army, conspirator of the May Coup, and member of the Black Hand.

Life
Ljubomir R. Vulović (Љубомир Р. Вуловић) was born in Vukosavce, in the Kragujevac okrug of the Principality of Serbia. He finished three years of gymnasium and the artillery NCO school. He was given the rank of lieutenant on 21 March 1898, then elevated to major on 14 March 1899.

He was a founding member of the Central Board of Vranje, of the Serbian Chetnik Organization, alongside Ljuba Čupa, V. Karić, S. Zlatičanin, Jovan Nenadović, Dragiša Đurić, Petar Pešić, and others.

 
Nikola Pašić decided to get rid of the most prominent members of the Black Hand movement, by then officially disbanded. Dimitrijević and several of his military colleagues were arrested and tried on false charges of the attempted assassination of Regent Alexander I Karađorđević. On 23 May 1917, following the so-called Salonika Trial, Colonel Dragutin Dimitrijević, Major Ljubomir Vulović and Rade Malobabić were found guilty of treason and sentenced to death. A month later, on 23 June they were executed by firing squad. After World War II, Apis and his associates were rehabilitated.

He was married and had a child.

Awards
Order of St. Sava.

See also
 List of Chetnik voivodes

References

Sources

1876 births
1917 deaths
Military personnel from Kragujevac
People from the Principality of Serbia
Royal Serbian Army soldiers
Chetniks of the Macedonian Struggle
Recipients of the Order of St. Sava
People executed by Serbia by firing squad